Chronos is a 2016 action role-playing game developed and published by Gunfire Games for the Oculus Rift virtual reality (VR) headset. The game received generally positive reviews upon release. An overhauled version of the game, titled Chronos: Before the Ashes was released for Microsoft Windows, PlayStation 4, Nintendo Switch, Xbox One and Stadia on December 1, 2020.

Gameplay
Chronos is an action role-playing game viewed from a third-person perspective, though the game only has a fixed camera similar to the early Resident Evil games. In the game, the player assumes control of a customizable protagonist, who is on a quest to kill a dragon inside a labyrinth. The game's combat mainly involves slashing enemies with melee weapons while fending off hostile attacks with a shield. Should the player die when they are exploring, they can only reenter the labyrinth one in-game year later, and the player character will age, which alters the character's attributes. As the player progresses in the game, they will solve puzzles, acquire new weapons and unlock magical powers. As the player earns experience, they will level up which allows them to improve the player character's attributes including strength, agility, arcane, and vitality.

Development
The game was the first title released by Gunfire Games, which was founded by David Adams, the founder of Vigil Games who have created the Darksiders series. The game was announced on June 11, 2015, during a press conference held by the Oculus. It was among the first titles unveiled for the Oculus Rift VR headset and it became the headset's launch game when it was released on March 28, 2016.

In September 2020, THQ Nordic announced an overhauled version of the game named Chronos: Before the Ashes. This version of the game removes the VR requirement, and serves as the prequel to Gunfire's Remnant: From the Ashes. The game was released for Microsoft Windows, PlayStation 4, Xbox One, Nintendo Switch and Stadia on December 1, 2020.

Reception

The game received generally positive reviews according to review aggregator Metacritic. Critics compared the game to The Legend of Zelda and Dark Souls series. Some critics noted that gameplay-wise, the game was traditional but the incorporation of VR elevated the experience.

References

Official website
 

2016 video games
Role-playing video games
Video games developed in the United States
Oculus Rift games
Virtual reality games
Windows games
Nintendo Switch games
PlayStation 4 games
Stadia games
Xbox One games
THQ Nordic games
Soulslike video games
Single-player video games